Timothy Taylor Merwin (August 22, 1807 – January 15, 1885) was an American lawyer, state legislator, and businessman.

Merwin, eldest child of the Rev. Samuel Merwin, pastor of the United Society (later called the United Church on the Green) in New Haven, and Clarina B. (Taylor) Merwin, was born in New Haven, August 22, 1807. He graduated from Yale College in 1827. He attended Yale Law School for two years, until June, 1829, when he was admitted to the Connecticut bar. He then began the practice of his profession in Norwalk, where he remained until December, 1843, when he removed to New York City. During his residence in Connecticut, he was once (1838) a member of the Connecticut General Assembly, and for several years clerk of the county courts. He was also for a part of the time proprietor and editor of the Norwalk Gazette. On removing to New York he relinquished his profession, and was for some years engaged in a lucrative mercantile business; later, he was entrusted with the management of a railroad, and thence drifted into the New York Stock Exchange. In 1862 he was engaged with others in founding and organizing the North American Life Insurance Company, of which he was the first Secretary and for a long time (and at his death) the Vice President. After frequent attacks of heart-disease, he died from that cause at his home in Brooklyn, January 15, 1885, in his 78th year.

In September, 1830, he was married to Hannah B. White, youngest daughter of Col. E. Moss White, of Danbury, Conn., by whom he had two sons and one daughter, who survived him. Her death in October, 1843, in connection with the failure of his health, was the occasion of the relinquishment of his profession and his removal to New York.

External links
 

1807 births
1885 deaths
Politicians from New Haven, Connecticut
Yale Law School alumni
Connecticut lawyers
American newspaper editors
Members of the Connecticut General Assembly
Connecticut local politicians
American railroad executives
American businesspeople in insurance
19th-century American politicians
Lawyers from New Haven, Connecticut
Yale College alumni
19th-century American lawyers
19th-century American businesspeople